This is a list of museums in Cuba.

By province

Artemisa
 Alquízar Municipal Museum
 Artemisa Municipal Museum
 Bahía Honda Municipal Museum
 Bauta Municipal Museum
 Candelaria Municipal Museum
 Guanajay Municipal Museum
 Güira de Melena Municipal Museum
 Mariel Municipal Museum
 San Antonio de los Baños Municipal Museum
 San Cristóbal Municipal Museum

Camagüey
 Carlos Manuel de Céspedes Municipal Museum
 Esmeralda Municipal Museum
 Guáimaro Municipal Museum
 Florida Municipal Museum
 Jimaguayú Municipal Museum
 Minas Municipal Museum
 Najasa Municipal Museum
 Nuevitas Municipal Museum
 Santa Cruz del Sur Municipal Museum
 Sibanicú Municipal Museum
 Sierra de Cubitas Municipal Museum
 Vertientes Municipal Museum

Ciego de Ávila
 Baraguá Municipal Museum
 Bolivia Municipal Museum
 Chambas Municipal Museum
 Ciro Redondo Municipal Museum
 Florencia Municipal Museum
 Majagua Municipal Museum
 Morón Municipal Museum
 Primero de Enero Municipal Museum
 Venezuela Municipal Museum

Granma
 Guisa Municipal Museum

Havana
 Museo de los Orishas y las regiliginoes afrocubanas (Afrocuban culture and religions museum, Guanabacoa, Havana)
 Casa de Africa (Africa House, Havana)
 Castillo de la Real Fuerza (Havana)
 Colon Cemetery, Havana (Havana) 
 Museo de la Danza (Havana) 
 The Capitol Building
 Depósito del Automóvil (Havana)
 Finca Vigía (Havana)
 Granma (yacht), Havana
 José Martí Memorial (Havana)
 La Cabaña (Havana)
 Museo del Aire (Havana)
 Museo Nacional de Historia Natural de Cuba, Havana
 Museo Nacional de Bellas Artes de La Habana; National Museum of Fine Arts (Havana, Cuba)
 Museum of Decorative Arts, El Vedado, Havana
 Museum of the Revolution (Havana, Cuba)
 Napoleonic Museum (Havana)
 Palacio de los Capitanes Generales (Havana)
 Taquechel Pharmacy Museum (Havana)
 The Ludwig Foundation of Cuba, Havana
 Museo del Ron Havana Club (Rum Museum, Havana)
 Museo de la Ciudad (Museum of the City of Havana)
 Museo del Chocolate (Chocolate Museum), Havana
 Museo del Naipe (Museum of playing cards, Havana)
 Museo de Arte Colonial
 National Museum of Contemporary Ceramics 
 Fusterlandia
 Museo postal cubano (Filatelia), Havana

Isla de la Juventud
 Presidio Modelo

Matanzas
 Museo Histórico Provincial de Matanzas
 Galería Pedro Esquerré Museum, Provincial Council of Fine Arts,

Mayabeque
 Batabanó Municipal Museum
 Bejucal Municipal Museum
 Güines Municipal Museum
 Jaruco Municipal Museum
 Madruga Municipal Museum
 Melena del Sur Municipal Museum
 Nueva Paz Municipal Museum
 Quivicán Municipal Museum
 San José de las Lajas Municipal Museum
 San Nicolás de Bari Municipal Museum
 Santa Cruz del Norte Municipal Museum

Pinar del Río
 Consolación del Sur Municipal Museum
 Guane Municipal Museum
 La Palma Municipal Museum
 Los Palacios Municipal Museum
 Mantua Municipal Museum
 Minas de Matahambre Municipal Museum
 San Juan y Martínez Municipal Museum
 San Luis Municipal Museum
 Sandino Municipal Museum
 Viñales Municipal Museum

Santiago de Cuba
 Museo Abel Santamaría Cuadrado

Villa Clara
 Che Guevara Mausoleum
 El Mejunje
 Tren Blindado
 Villa Clara Provincial Museum

See also 

 List of museums
 Tourism in Cuba
 Culture of Cuba

 
Museums
Cuba
Museums
Cuba
Museums